The Student National Medical Association (SNMA), established in 1964, is the oldest and largest independent, student-run organization focused on the needs and concerns of black medical students in the United States. It was established as a subdivision of the National Medical Association in 1964 by medical students from Howard University and Meharry Medical College. The organization is committed to supporting current and future underrepresented minority medical students, addressing the needs of underserved communities, and increasing the number of clinically excellent, culturally competent and socially conscious physicians.

Composition
SNMA has over 150 medical chapters, which implement educational, outreach, and mentoring activities consistent with the goals of the organization.  Premedical MAPS chapters work with their host SNMA chapters to hold workshops, speakers, medical campus tours, and advising sessions. Chapters belong to one of ten SNMA regions, each headed by a Regional Director.  The Regional Director supports chapter programs and oversees a regional medical education conference, as well as other regional activities.

2011-2012 program focus
In spring 2011, National President Michael G. Knight introduced the 2010-2011 programmatic strategy that is focused on envisioning the SNMA's organizational future, engaging the SNMA membership, and empowering underserved communities.

President Knight launched two Presidential Initiatives for the 2011-2012 administrative year.
 The “MED Project”, is designed to develop an SNMA membership base that is engaged, invested in the SNMA, and provided with tools to enhance their personal and professional development. The first component of this initiative involves the Membership Engagement and Development (MED) Forums, which are focused meetings designed to provide enrichment for participants in their areas of interest. The second component is “Project Success", which is focused on enhancing the academic support provided by the SNMA for its membership.
 The second initiative, “The Signature Collection,” is designed to further define the SNMA’s signature programs, and to optimize their effectiveness and prominence. The first component is the Pipeline Initiative, which is focused on the continued development of our Pipeline Mentoring Institute, and involves a partnership with the Boys and Girls Clubs of America, whose programs successfully reach a large group of youth nationwide. The second is the Community Empowerment Initiative. It involves the SNMA Greater Than AIDS campaign, which builds upon our well-established Sexual Health Awareness Protocol and its specific focus on HIV/AIDS education and prevention.

List of National Presidents of the Student National Medical Association
 2005-2006 Kameron Leigh Matthews
 2006-2007 Brandi Freeman
 2007-2008 Rory Goodwin
 2008-2009 Lisa Green
 2009-2010 Travelle Franklin-Ford
 2010-2011 Bryant Cameron Webb
 2011-2012 Michael G. Knight
 2012-2013 Nisha Branch
 2013-2014 Courtney Johnson
 2014-2015 Topaz Sampson
 2015-2016 Anthony Kulukulualani
 2016-2017 Christen Johnson
 2017-2018 Danielle Ward
 2018-2019 Gabriel Felix
 2019-2020 Omonivie Agboghidi
 2020-2021 Osose Oboh
 2021-2022 Chantel Thompson
 2022-2023 Nita Gombakomba

Annual Medical Education Conference

The SNMA Annual Medical Education Conference is a focal activity for the national organization. It is held each spring in various locations around the country. Its purpose is to enhance and facilitate career development, continuing education, and networking among minority medical students. Included in the AMEC is the annual session of the House of Delegates and the election of national officers. The conference attracts over 2,000 students and professionals from across the country, and is consistently the largest gathering of underrepresented minority medical students in the US.

National protocols
National protocols are implemented on the local level by individual SNMA chapters.  They reflect the community service goals of the national organization.

Pipeline programs
 Youth Science Enrichment Program
This program is focused on working with elementary and junior high school students to spark their interest in science and health.
 Health Professions Recruitment Exposure Program
This initiative functions to increase the exposure of high school students to science and careers in the health sciences.
 Minority Association of Pre-medical Students
Pre-medical students are able to form SNMA MAPS chapters at their undergraduate institutions. There are currently over 100 MAPS chapters nationwide that are supported by local SNMA chapters.

Minority Association of Premedical Students
This initiative represents future underrepresented medical students. Though each chapter is different the goal of these on-campus associations is to unite historically underrepresented minorities that aspire to become physicians and provide them with resources and a social network of premedical students to facilitate the journey to medical school.

Health Education and Prevention
 Sexual Health Awareness
 Smoking Prevention
 Tissue & Organ Donation Education Recruitment Program (TODER)
 Violence Prevention
 Mental Health: Treatment, Awareness, and Prevention
 Healthy People 2010 Health Fairs
 Obesity Prevention

References

External links
 SNMA official website

Medical and health student organizations
Medical associations based in the United States
Student societies in the United States
African-American professional organizations
Student organizations established in 1964
Medical and health organizations based in Washington, D.C.
1964 establishments in the United States
1964 establishments in Washington (state)
Organizations established in 1964